Joseph Gilmore may refer to:

 Joseph A. Gilmore (1811–1867), governor of New Hampshire
 Joseph Michael Gilmore (1893–1962), American bishop